In military terms, 158th Division or 158th Infantry Division may refer to:

 158th Infantry Division (Wehrmacht)
 158th Infantry Division (France) (1915–1917)
 158th Infantry Division Zara (Italian, World War II)